Nada Boustani Khoury (born 27 January 1983) is a Lebanese politician. She was born in Ain el-Rihaneh. She was named by the Free Patriotic Movement to serve as Minister of Energy and Water in the cabinet of Saad Hariri on 4 February 2019. She was the first woman to be appointed Minister of Energy and Water.

References 

21st-century Lebanese women politicians
21st-century Lebanese politicians
Women government ministers of Lebanon
Free Patriotic Movement politicians
1983 births
Living people
Lebanese Maronites
People from Keserwan District